The Seychelles national U-17 football team is the representative of Seychelles within all international tournaments that pertain to that age level. It is controlled and administered by the Seychelles Football Federation.

History
The Seychelles national U-17 football team won the 1995 Commission de la Jeunesse et des Sports de l’Océan Indien (CJSOI) competition in Madagascar. They made their first Africa U-17 Cup of Nations appearance at the 2001 African U-17 Championship after they qualified as host. They also made their debut COSAFA U-17 competition in 2016 in Mauritius following their 1-0 loss to South Africa.

Honours
 Commission de la Jeunesse et des Sports de l’Océan Indien
 Winner (1): 1995

Competitive record

Africa U-17 Cup of Nations

Current squad

See also
Seychelles national football team

References

External links

U
African national under-17 association football teams